A Woman of Pleasure is a lost 1919 American silent drama film directed by Wallace Worsley and starring Blanche Sweet. It was distributed by Pathé Exchange in the United States.

Cast
 Blanche Sweet as Alice Dane
 Wheeler Oakman as Bobby Ralston
 Wilfred Lucas as Sir John Thornbull
 Wesley Barry as Danny Thomas
 Frederick Star as Cetygoola 
 Milton Ross as Jim Dench
 Josef Swickard as Rev. Mr. Goddard
 Spottiswoode Aitken as Wilberforce Pace

See also
Blanche Sweet filmography

References

External links

 
 

1919 films
1919 drama films
Silent American drama films
American silent feature films
American black-and-white films
American independent films
Films directed by Wallace Worsley
Lost American films
Pathé Exchange films
1919 lost films
Lost drama films
1910s independent films
1910s American films